Kamo Kenkakumikami no Mikoto is a God in Japanese mythology, also known as Kamotaketsunomikoto.

Overview 
He is also known by the names Yatagarasu, Yatagarasu Kamo Takekazumi no Mikoto, Mishima no Mizokui, Mishima Mizokui, Mishima Mizokusaikomi no Kami, Suetsumimi no Mikoto, Suetsumimi and Amahigatakushihigata Takechinutsumi.

He is the founder of the Kamo clan of Yamashiro Province, the Kamo Prefecture and the Katsuragi Province, and is known as the deity of the Shimogamo Shrine (Shimogamo Shrine).

According to Shinsengumi Roku, Kamo Kenkakumimikoto is the grandson of Kamitonomikoto. Kamo Kenkakumikuninomikoto]], under the command of Takagi-kami and Amaterasu, descended from the sky to the peak of Tsune in Hyuga and reached Mount Katsuragi in Yamato, where he incarnated as Yatagarasu and led Jimmu Emperor Jimmu and contributed to his victory.

According to the Yamashiro-kuni Fudoki (an anecdote), he came from Katsuragiyama in Yamato to Kamo in Okada in Yamashiro (where the Okada Kamo Shrine is located) and settled at the confluence of the Katsuno River (Koya River) and the Kamo River (Kamo River) (where the Shimogamo Shrine is located).

Kamo Kenkakumimikoto had two sons, Taketamayorihiko-no-mikoto and Taketamayorihime no-mikoto. Taketamayorihikonomikoto later became the Lord of Kamo Prefecture. Taketamayorihime is said to have conceived and given birth to Kamo Bessarai-no-mikoto (the deity of Kamigamo Shrine) while keeping Honokazuchi-no-kami, who was incarnated as a Tanuria arrow, near her floor (Yamashiro However, in the Kojiki, the Nihon Shoki, and the Sekaiyo Koshihonki, she is said to have become the wife of Kotoshironushi or Omononushi, and to have given birth to Kushimikata-no-mikoto, Himetataraisuzu-hime and Isuzuyori-hime.

Genealogy 
The genealogy of the Kamo clan is "Kami-no-Sanrei-tsun-no-Mikoto-Tenjin-tama-no-Mikoto-Tenkushitama-no-Mikoto-Kamo-tatemikazumi-no-Mikoto-Kamo-tatemuyorihiko-no-Mikoto-Gojutemi-no-Mikoto (ancestor of the Kamo clan). Takamimusubi]]-Amakatatama-no-mikoto, Amaoshitate-no-mikoto, Tohtsumimi-no-mikoto, Tamayorihiko-no-mikoto, and Ikutama-ni-no-mikoto (ancestor of the Kamo clan). The Naniwada Shusshusu genealogical chart continues, "Amakatadama-no-mikoto - Amashitadama-no-mikoto (Kamikushi-tamamikoto'') - To-tsumimi-no-mikoto - Tamayorihiko-no-mikoto'''", which means, "Tenjin-tamamikoto (Amakatadama-no-mikoto, Ikutama-no-mikoto) - Amakushi-tamamikoto (Kamikushi-tamikoto, Amashitadama-no-mikoto) - Kamo-tenkakumikami-no-mikoto (Yatagarasu, To-tsumimi-no-mikoto) - Kamo-taketama-yorihiko-no-mikoto (Tamayorihiko-no-mikoto)". Yorihiko-no-mikoto (Tamayorihiko-no-mikoto) - Gojutemi-no-mikoto (Ikutama-nihiko-no-mikoto)."

His daughters include Emperor Jimmu's wife, Himetataraisuzu-hime's mother, Seiyatara-hime (活玉依毘売, Tamagushi-hime, Tamayori-hime no Mikoto, Tatamayori-hime no Mikoto). In other words, Kamo no Kenkakumimikoto was the father of Emperor Jimmu's mother, and if Kamo no Kenkakumimikoto is considered to be the same god as Yatagarasu, the generation relationship would be very inconsistent. 

Yatagarasu appears in Kojiki and Nihon Shoki, and in Nihon Shoki, it is also said that Kin Kite (golden Tobi) helped Emperor Jinmu in his battle with Naganomushihiko in the same scene of Jinmu's eastern expedition, which is another name for the god Amanohiwashi Ame-no-kanatomi-no-mikoto, whose name is related to kinshi (golden kite), and therefore is considered to be the same as Ame-no-hikawashi-no-mikoto and Kamo-kenkakumikami-no-mikoto by Hirata Atsutane and others.

References

See Also 

 Shimogamo Shrine
 List of Japanese deities
Japanese gods
Amatsukami